Dragsmark Abbey was a Premonstratensian canonry in Båhuslen, formerly Norway, now Bohuslän, Sweden.

History
The monastery at Dragsmark, also known as "Marieskog" in Norwegian, was founded some time before 1260, with the support of King Håkon Håkonsson, and was dedicated to the Blessed Virgin Mary.

The abbey was very wealthy in its heyday and ran a prestigious school, but declined during the 15th century, and as early as 1519 was in the control of a lay administrator, the first monastery in Norway to be secularised. With the Reformation the Crown granted it to a tenant in 1532, with a condition that the remaining canons had to be maintained. The buildings fell into disrepair, and in 1610 were used as a quarry for stone for the construction of Båhus Fortress.

Site

The monastery ruins are on the west of Bokenäset on the fjord between Uddevalla and the sea, north of the island of Orust.

In 1897-98 the ruins were investigated. The church measured about 20 metres by 10 metres, with the conventual buildings to the south, but only two chambers nearest the church have been explored, probably the sacristy and the chapter house. There are traces of other buildings further to the south, and to the west the remains of another building, the relation of which to the rest of the site is not clear.

Notes

Sources

 Norges klostre i middelalderen: Dragsmark

References
 Niklasson, N. (1952–57): Klostret i den stilla dalen. I: Vikavarvet Årsbok, pp. 3–27. Lysekil: Fornminneselskapet

Premonstratensian monasteries in Norway
Premonstratensian monasteries in Sweden
Monasteries in Bohuslän
Ruins in Sweden
Christian monasteries established in the 13th century
Medieval Norway
Monasteries dissolved under the Norwegian Reformation
Demolished buildings and structures in Sweden